Chandi Bhanjyang may refer to:

Chandi Bhanjyang, Gandaki, Nepal
Chandi Bhanjyang, Narayani, Nepal